Benjamin Young House in Stevensville, Montana, also known as Cole House, is a -story cross-gabled Carpenter Gothic house which was built in 1900 and has since been expanded.  It was built by a relatively rare plank-wall construction method.

It was listed on the National Register of Historic Places in 1991.

A root house built in 1909, a root cellar also built in 1909, and a garage are contributing buildings.

References

Houses on the National Register of Historic Places in Montana
Houses completed in 1900
Carpenter Gothic architecture in Montana
Houses in Ravalli County, Montana
National Register of Historic Places in Ravalli County, Montana
1900 establishments in Montana